The Wran ministry (1980–1981) or Third Wran ministry was the 73rd ministry of the New South Wales Government, and was led by the 35th Premier of New South Wales, Neville Wran, representing the Labor Party. It was the third of eight consecutive occasions when Wran was Premier.

Background
Wran had been elected to the Legislative Council of New South Wales by a joint sitting of the New South Wales Parliament on 12 March 1970. He was Leader of the Opposition in the Legislative Council from 22 February 1972. He resigned from the council on 19 October 1973 to switch to the Legislative Assembly, successfully contesting the election for Bass Hill, which he would hold until his retirement in 1986. Wran successfully challenged Pat Hills to become Leader of Labor Party and Leader of the Opposition from 3 December 1973 and became Premier following a narrow one seat victory at the 1976 election.

Labor retained government at the 1978 election in a landslide victory, popularly known as the "Wranslide", with a majority of 14 seats in the Legislative Assembly and four seats in the Legislative Council.

The reconfiguration of the ministry was triggered by the  resignation of former Premier Jack Renshaw.

Composition of ministry
The ministry covers the period from 29 February 1980 until 2 October 1981 when the Wran–led Labor Party was re-elected at the 1981 election, and the Fourth Wran ministry was formed.

 
Ministers are members of the Legislative Assembly unless otherwise noted.

See also

Members of the New South Wales Legislative Assembly, 1978–1981
Members of the New South Wales Legislative Council, 1978–1981

Notes

References

 

New South Wales ministries
1980 establishments in Australia
1981 disestablishments in Australia
Australian Labor Party ministries in New South Wales